Mary Paula Chadwick  is a British physicist who is professor and head of the Department of Physics at Durham University. Her research investigates gamma-ray astronomy and astroparticle physics. She is involved with the Cherenkov Telescope Array.

Early life and education 
Chadwick has said she became interested in astronomy as a child. She was six when humans landed on the moon, and she thinks this may have triggered her passion. Chadwick was an undergraduate student at Queen Mary University of London. She moved to Durham University for her doctoral research, where she studied high energy cosmic gamma rays from pulsars.

Research and career 
Chadwick leads gamma-ray astronomy at Durham University. She is particularly interested in supernova explosions and black holes which produce high-speed jets. When gamma rays (the most energetic form of electromagnetic radiation) hit the atmosphere, they produce a cascade of high energy matter that travels faster than the speed of light in air. This produces a brief flash of high energy light (Cherenkov radiation), which Chadwick tries to detect with large telescopes.

In 2015, Chadwick was awarded the Lawrence Bragg Medal and Prize for her efforts to engage undergraduates with industry.

Selected publications

References 

Living people
Year of birth missing (living people)
Alumni of Durham University
British physicists
British women scientists